This is a list of fossiliferous stratigraphic units in Djibouti.



List of fossiliferous stratigraphic units

See also 
 Lists of fossiliferous stratigraphic units in Africa
 List of fossiliferous stratigraphic units in Eritrea
 List of fossiliferous stratigraphic units in Ethiopia
 Geology of Djibouti

References

Further reading 
 L. de Bonis, D. Geraads, J. Jaeger and S. Sen. 1988. Vertebres du Pleistocene de Djibouti. Bulletin Society Geol. France IV(2):323-334
 H. Thomas and Y. Coppens. 1984. Discovery of Fossil Vertebrates in the Lower Pleistocene of the Republic of Djibouti. Correspondant de Academie, Feb1984

Djibouti
 
Djibouti
Djibouti geography-related lists
Fossil